Aetashaa Sansgiri is an Indian actress and model who primarily works in Marathi and Hindi television along with Marathi films. She made her acting debut in 2018 with Choti Malkein, portraying Revati. She then made her web debut in 2019 with Majhya Mitrachi Girlfriend and her film debut in 2021 with the Marathi film Kaali Maati.

Since August 2021, Sansgiri is seen portraying Ahilyabai Holkar in Punyashlok Ahilyabai.

Career
Sansgiri made her acting debut in 2018 with the Marathi serial Choti Malkin. She played the role of Revati opposite Akshar Kothari. The show ended in 2019. In 2019, she appeared as Annapurneshawari, in her web debut series, Majhya Mitrachi Girlfriend.

She played Yamai Devi in Marathi serial, Dakkhancha Raja Jyotiba from 2020 to 2021. She also played Saara in her Hindi web debut series, Chal Yaar Goa Chalte Hain. It released on Viral Kekda and MX Player.

Sansgiri made her film debut in 2021, with the Marathi film Kaali Maati as Pooja opposite Omprakash Shinde. She then appeared in the short film An Unusual Day as a thief.

Sansgiri made her Hindi TV debut Punyashlok Ahilyabai in 2021. Since 2021, she is portraying Ahilyabai Holkar opposite Gaurav Amlani which proved as a major turning point in her career.

She portrayed Teela in the 2022 Marathi film Vishu alongside Gashmeer Mahajani and Mrinmayee Godbole. A reviewer complimented her performance.

Filmography

Films

Television

Web series

Awards and nominations

See also
List of Hindi television actresses
Actresses in Marathi television

References

External links
 
 

1994 births
Living people
21st-century Indian actresses
Actresses from Mumbai
Actresses in Marathi cinema
Actresses in Hindi cinema
Indian web series actresses
Actresses in Marathi television
Actresses in Hindi television
Indian soap opera actresses